The Sutherland State Aid Bridge is a historic bridge in Sutherland, Nebraska. It was built in 1914 by Lincoln Construction Co., with concrete spandrel arches. It has been listed on the National Register of Historic Places since June 29, 1992.

References

Bridges completed in 1914
Bridges on the National Register of Historic Places in Nebraska
National Register of Historic Places in Lincoln County, Nebraska
1914 establishments in Nebraska